Martin James Evans  (16 October 1904 – 17 December 1998) was an English first-class cricketer and Royal Navy officer.

Evans was born in October 1904 at Kingsclere, Hampshire. After enlisting in the Royal Navy, he was promoted from the rank of midshipman to sub-lieutenant in July 1925. He made a single appearance in first-class cricket for the Royal Navy against the British Army cricket team at Lord's in 1925. Batting twice in the match, he ended the Royal Navy first-innings not out on 7, while in their second-innings he was dismissed for a single run by Geoffrey Cooke. With the ball, he bowled a total of nine wicketless overs in the Army first-innings, conceding 42 runs. He was promoted to the rank of lieutenant in February 1927, with promotion to the rank of lieutenant commander in February 1935. 

Evans served with the Royal Navy in the Second World War, during which he was promoted to the rank of commander in December 1940. He was made an OBE in December 1942, before being made a CBE in August 1945. Following the war, he was awarded the Legion of Merit by the United States in May 1946 and promoted to the rank of captain the following month. Evans died in December 1998 at Peasmarsh Place retirement home in the Sussex village of Peasmarsh.

References

External links

1904 births
1998 deaths
Military personnel from Hampshire
People from Kingsclere
Royal Navy officers
English cricketers
Royal Navy cricketers
Royal Navy personnel of World War II
Commanders of the Order of the British Empire
Legionnaires of the Legion of Merit
People from Peasmarsh